Coastal Plain League may refer to:
Coastal Plain League, current Collegiate Summer Baseball League
Coastal Plain League (Class D), former minor league circuit (1937–1941,1946–1952)
Coastal Plain League (semi pro), former semi-pro baseball circuit (1935–1936)